Steven Diaz (born May 11, 1986 in Jackson Heights, New York) is an American soccer player who most recently played for the New York Cosmos.

Career

College and amateur
Diaz  played college soccer at Briarcliffe College, helping his team to the 2008 USCAA Men's Soccer Championship. He was named to the NJCAA All-American 1st Team, the All-Region 1st Team and the All-Conference 1st Team in 2005, and was an ODP New York State Player in 2003, 2004 and 2005.

During his college years Diaz also played in the USL Premier Development League for the Brooklyn Knights.

Professional
Diaz signed his first professional contract with Club Deportivo Tulua (commonly known as Cortuluá) in Colombia in 2010. In 2011, he trained with New York Redbulls and later was signed by F.C. New York of the USL Professional Division. He made his debut on April 23, 2011 in a 0-0 tie with the Charlotte Eagles. In 2014, Diaz signed with Puerto Rico Bayamon FC and helped qualify them to the Concacaf Champions League after participating in the CFU Championships' Cup.

In 2014, Diaz signed with the New York Cosmos where he served as a back-up goalkeeper behind Jimmy Maurer and Kyle Zobeck. He was released following the end of the 2014 season.

References

External links
 Infosport

1986 births
Living people
American soccer players
Brooklyn Knights players
F.C. New York players
Ocala Stampede players
New York Cosmos (2010) players
USL League Two players
USL Championship players
Association football goalkeepers